Persatuan Sepakbola Dumai (smiply known as Persemai Dumai or Persemai) is an Indonesian football club based in Dumai, Riau. They currently compete in the Liga 3.

References

External links

Football clubs in Indonesia
Football clubs in Riau
Association football clubs established in 1967
1967 establishments in Indonesia